Intermission is a 2003 Irish black comedy crime film directed by John Crowley and written by Mark O'Rowe. The film, set in Dublin, Ireland, contains many interconnected storylines, and is shot in a documentary-like style, with some sections presented as excerpts from television programs that exist within the show (one of the storylines follows a television documentary director).

It features several of Ireland's best-known actors, including Cillian Murphy, Colm Meaney and Colin Farrell, all of whom have featured in internationally successful films such as 28 Days Later (Murphy), The Commitments (Meaney) and Minority Report (Farrell). It also featured the Scottish actress Kelly Macdonald who had appeared in Trainspotting.

Plot 
The film opens with Lehiff (Colin Farrell) charming a cashier. After flirting with the girl, punches her in the face and steals from the till. It quickly moves to John (Cillian Murphy) and Deirdre (Kelly Macdonald), a recently-separated young couple. The film will revolve around their extended friends.

It is quickly revealed that Lehiff is a petty criminal and always involved in trouble. Lehiff's nemesis, Garda Detective Jerry Lynch (Colm Meaney), presents himself as a saviour whose main mission is to fight the "scumbags" on Dublin's streets. He enlists the help of Ben Campion (Tomás Ó Súilleabháin), an ambitious film-maker and the bane of his "go-softer" boss, who considers Lynch too nasty a subject to be shown on a mainstream "docusoap" series on Irish television.

Next up is Mick (Brían F. O'Byrne), a Dublin bus driver. While on his route, Sally (Shirley Henderson) boards. Deeply insecure about her looks, she asks Mick about some hair on her lip, and he mocks her playfully. As the bus journey continues, Philip, a young boy, throws a rock at his bus, resulting in a bad crash, the aftermath of which Ben winds up shooting. Ben is told to focus his attention on Sally, Deirdre's sister, who helped the passengers after the crash. She grows bitter when Deirdre flaunts her new boyfriend, Sam (Michael McElhatton), a middle-aged bank manager who has left his wife of fourteen years, Noeleen, leaving her to question her own self-worth as a woman and wife.

John is utterly lost without Deirdre and is determined to win her back. Mick, having become suspended from his job and low on funds, comes up with a scheme involving Lehiff and John. They kidnap Sam and hold Deirdre captive. They force Sam to go to his bank to get money for a ransom. Just as the plan seems to be working out, everything goes wrong, as Sam is assaulted by his enraged wife Noeleen on the street and the Gardaí are forced to intervene. Mick and John flee without the money.

Later, Mick loses his job after being wrongfully blamed for the crash; he becomes obsessed with taking revenge on the boy who caused it. After chasing Philip in his car, he loses control and is left balancing over the canal. Philip sits on the bonnet and jumps off, letting the car drop into the canal.

Detective Lynch chases and corners Lehiff in an open field. He decides to take him on, while Ben films everything. Unfortunately, Lynch miscalculates; Lehiff gets the upper hand and threatens to kill him. Ben snatches at the gun and shoots Lehiff. Lynch covers it all up.

As the credits roll, Noeleen and Sam, now reunited, are in their house watching television. She is purposely sitting on the remote control and bullying him into changing the channels by hand.

Cast 
 Colin Farrell as Lehiff, a petty criminal with a penchant for getting into trouble with the law
 Kelly Macdonald as Deirdre
 Cillian Murphy as John, Deirdre's former boyfriend
 Colm Meaney as Detective Jerry Lynch
 Shirley Henderson as Sally
 David Wilmot as Oscar
 Deirdre O'Kane as Noeleen
 Michael McElhatton as Sam, a middle-aged bank manager
 Tomás Ó Súilleabháin as Ben Campion, an ambitious film-maker
 Brían F. O'Byrne as Mick, the bus driver
 Ger Ryan as Maura, the mother
 Jane Brennan as Mrs. Rooney

Release

Reception
The movie earned €2.5 million at the Irish box office, briefly becoming the most successful independent Irish film.

The film was well-received by critics. Rotten Tomatoes gave the film an aggregate rating of 74% based on 99 reviews, with an average score of 6.60/10, with the critical consensus describing the film as "an edgy and energetic ensemble story".

Noted critics Roger Ebert and Richard Roeper gave the film good reviews. Roeper described it as "a likable film about nasty people".

Following his work in the film, Patrick Condren became the first Irishman to be nominated at the Taurus World Stunt Awards.

Box office
The film earned $896,993 at the North American domestic box office and $3,959,305 internationally, for a worldwide total of $4,856,298, against a production budget of $5 million.

References

External links 
 
 
 

2003 films
2003 black comedy films
2000s crime comedy films
2000s English-language films
English-language Irish films
Films scored by John Murphy (composer)
Films directed by John Crowley
Films set in Dublin (city)
Films shot in Dublin (city)
Irish black comedy films
Irish crime comedy films
2003 directorial debut films
2003 comedy films